Carlos Andrés Muñoz (born 2 January 1992) is a professional racing driver from Colombia. He last drove for Schmidt Peterson Motorsports part-time in the IndyCar Series in 2018. He has twice finished second in the Indianapolis 500, during his rookie year in 2013 and in 2016.

Career

Karting
Born in Bogotá, Muñoz began his motorsport career in karting back in 2002.

Formula TR Pro Series FR 1600
In 2007, just fifteen years old, Muñoz made his debut in single-seaters, racing in the Formula TR Pro Series. He took one podium place in four races to end the season in eighth place.

Formula Renault
In 2008, Muñoz took part in both the Italian Formula Renault 2.0 and Eurocup Formula Renault 2.0 championships, racing for Prema Powerteam. In the Italian series, he finished sixteenth, taking six-point-scoring positions in twelve races. In the Eurocup, he failed to score a championship point with a best result of thirteenth at both the Nürburgring and Estoril.

The following season, Muñoz competed in both the Eurocup Formula Renault 2.0 and Formula Renault 2.0 West European Cup championships for Epsilon Euskadi. He finished eighth in the Eurocup standings, taking ten points-scoring positions in fourteen races, including a podium in the second race at the Nürburgring. In the West European Cup, he took seventh place in the championship, scoring two podium places.

Formula Three

Along with his Formula Renault campaigns, Muñoz competed in three rounds of the European F3 Open Championship, driving for Porteiro Motorsport. He finished eleventh in the championship, with a best result of second at Spa-Francorchamps. 2010 saw Muñoz move to the Formula 3 Euro Series, competing for Mücke Motorsport, joining Roberto Merhi at the team. Muñoz finished ninth in the championship with a runner-up finish at Brands Hatch as his best finish. He also competed in two rounds (six races) of the British Formula 3 Championship as a guest driver in the Invitational Class.

In 2011 Muñoz returned to F3 Euro Series, this time driving for Signature. He finished eighth in the championship with a best finish of third at Silverstone Circuit.

Indy Lights
In 2012, Muñoz moved to the United States to compete in the Indy Lights series for Andretti Autosport. He captured two victories, including one on the oval at Auto Club Speedway and a win from the pole in Edmonton, in addition to three other podium finishes on his way to fifth in the championship. Muñoz returned to the series for the 2013 season with Andretti Autosport and announced a deal to compete in the 2013 Indianapolis 500 with the team.

IndyCar Series

Muñoz qualified on the front row for the 2013 Indy 500 in second position and ran with the leaders all race long. He led twelve laps and finished in second place, winning Rookie of the Year honors.

At the 2013 Honda Indy Toronto, Muñoz replaced Panther Racing's Ryan Briscoe for Race 2 of the doubleheader after Briscoe broke his right wrist in an incident during Saturday's Race 1. After just 12 laps in the morning warmup to get acclimated with the car, Muñoz started 24th in the race and finished 17th.

Muñoz got his first IndyCar win in the rain-shortened Race 1 of the Detroit Belle Isle Dual Grand Prix on 30 May 2015.

After a distant second-place finish to teammate Alexander Rossi in the 2016 Indianapolis 500, Muñoz left Andretti Autosport after the 2016 IndyCar season ended. Muñoz joined A. J. Foyt Enterprises for the 2017 IndyCar season, lasting one season.

In 2018, Muñoz made his return to Andretti in a one-race deal at the 2018 Indianapolis 500, finishing seventh. Later in the season, he filled in for the injured Robert Wickens for the final two races of the season at Portland and Sonoma, driving for Schmidt Peterson Motorsports. Muñoz started 14th and finished 12th at Portland.

Racing record

Career summary

Complete Formula 3 Euro Series results

(key)

American open–wheel racing results
(key)

Indy Lights

IndyCar Series
(key)

* Season still in progress.

Indianapolis 500

References

External links

 
 
 

1992 births
Living people
Sportspeople from Bogotá
Colombian racing drivers
Indianapolis 500 drivers
Indianapolis 500 Rookies of the Year
IndyCar Series drivers
Colombian IndyCar Series drivers
Indy Lights drivers
Italian Formula Renault 2.0 drivers
Formula Renault Eurocup drivers
Formula Renault 2.0 WEC drivers
Euroformula Open Championship drivers
Formula 3 Euro Series drivers
British Formula Three Championship drivers
Prema Powerteam drivers
Andretti Autosport drivers
Signature Team drivers
Epsilon Euskadi drivers
Mücke Motorsport drivers
A. J. Foyt Enterprises drivers
Arrow McLaren SP drivers
Panther Racing drivers
HVM Racing drivers
AFS Racing drivers
Jenzer Motorsport drivers
Hitech Grand Prix drivers